The Tunnel Drive Trail is an out-and-back hiking trail located in Cañon City, Colorado. The trail parallels and overlooks the Arkansas River and the Royal Gorge Route Railroad. Popular with locals, the trail starts just inside the Cañon City city limits and then, crossing out of the city, it goes on State of Colorado and BLM land.

Original use
The trail was originally the site of a wooden irrigation canal that also supplied water to Cañon City. It was built in the late nineteenth-century and was called the redwood stave irrigation pipeline. The city stopped using the canal in 1974.

The canal passed through three tunnels cut out of the granite cliff on the north side of the trail. The trail now passes through the tunnels, one of which is quite long.

References

External links
 Official trail map

Hiking trails in Colorado
Tourist attractions in Colorado
 Cañon City, Colorado